Hindu Temple of Greater Wichita is a Hindu temple located in Wichita, Kansas. It serves the Hindu population of the Greater Wichita Area. It is located at 320 N Zelta Street.

History
Starting in the 1970s, Hindus started to move to the Greater Wichita area, most of whom were students at Wichita State University. As the community grew, there was greater demand for a permanent location for Hindus to congregate at. In 1998, Dr. Raghu and Rekha Reddi consulted with several Hindu families in the area to start the plans to build a Hindu temple. In February 2000, the Hindu Temple of Greater Wichita was registered as a religious charity by the IRS. The Hindu temple acquired land in February 2000 but the surrounding community opposed the idea of the Hindu temple due to traffic concerns. In 2001, the land was bought back by various people in the surrounding community and the Hindu temple sought new land. In March, 2.5 acres was acquired on North Zelta Street and construction began. On June 16, 2002, The temple celebrated its opening ceremony. The opening ceremony was attended by 7 Hindu Priest and 1 Jain Priest. Mayor Knight declared June 16, Hindu Temple of Greater Wichita day. In 2005, The 2nd anniversary of the temple was celebrated with installing various murtis, Hindu gods, in the temple.  In 2013, after much opposition from the local community, expanded an additional 2.5 acres to start construction of a community hall, kitchen and library.

Awards
In 2018, HTGW won a humanitarian award for its members collecting supplies for refugees in the Wichita Area.

References

Buildings and structures in Sedgwick County, Kansas
Hinduism in the United States
Religious buildings and structures completed in 2002
2000 establishments in Kansas
Religious organizations established in 2002
Asian-American culture in Kansas
Indian-American culture in Kansas
21st-century Hindu temples